ShareFile is a secure content collaboration, file sharing and sync software that supports all the document-centric tasks and workflow needs of small and large businesses. The company also offers cloud-based or on-premises storage, virtual data rooms and client portals. ShareFile is owned by Citrix Systems.

History

Early history
Jesse Lipson, a self-taught programmer, built and launched ShareFile in November 2005 in Raleigh, North Carolina.

Lipson created ShareFile after several of his website design clients asked him to build a password-protected area where they could set up folders and exchange business files with their clients. He felt FTP sites of the time were insufficient and saw an opportunity to create a web-based product. ShareFile launched without a free version or outside funding, and focused on acquiring only business customers.

By 2011, ShareFile had 3 million users in 100 countries.  ShareFile was included on the Inc. 500 list of Fastest Growing Private Companies in both 2010 and 2011.

Acquisition by Citrix Systems
In October 2011, ShareFile was acquired by Citrix Systems. Under terms of the agreement, ShareFile was offered as a standalone service in addition to its software becoming integrated into Citrix products. With the acquisition, Lipson became vice president and general manager of a new data sharing division within Citrix under the deal. As of 2016, Lipson is corporate vice president and general manager of cloud services, which includes ShareFile and Citrix Workspace Cloud.

A new 171,000-square-foot Raleigh office opened in October 2014 for Raleigh-based Citrix employees. As of April 2015, ShareFile had 55,000 corporate customers and 40 million users.

Product overview
ShareFile is a secure, cloud-based platform for businesses to store and share large files. Businesses are able to create branded, password-protected areas for files through the service. The software has a client-portal feature businesses can set up and customize to allow outside vendors and clients access to specific projects and files.
Other ShareFile features include the ability to send and obtain e-signatures on documents with the integration of RightSignature; the ability to send encrypted email through a Microsoft Outlook plugin or an online portal, Office 365 connection to access and edit documents stored in SharePoint Online and OneDrive for Business; and the ability for individuals to migrate data from their personal clouds into ShareFile.
There are also mobile app versions of ShareFile, which allow mobile editing and offline editing of documents.

Security features
ShareFile users have the option to store data in their own data centers, Citrix-managed data centers, or use existing file storage systems via StorageZone Connectors. This allows companies to host files that they do not want stored in the cloud, in some cases due to regulatory concerns.
IT managers can manage corporate content on ShareFile using remote wipe, encryption, passcode lock and poison pill features. In addition, companies are able to restrict third-party editing tools that employees might try to install on their devices, and audit content accessed from a device that has been lost or stolen.

Industry-specific features
In response to updated regulations with HIPAA standards, Citrix created ShareFile Cloud for Health Care in 2013. This private virtual cloud was designed to help companies stay compliant with updated HIPAA standards. It runs on the AWS Cloud, but sets aside specific virtual servers to host protected health information (PHI).
Also in 2013, ShareFile began offering  a feature called "Archiving for Financial Services" to help organizations in the financial sector comply with data archiving regulations put forth by the U.S. Securities and Exchange Commission and Financial Industry Regulatory Authority.

See also
Cloud computing 
File synchronization  
Hybrid cloud
Virtual data room

References

Citrix Systems
File hosting
File sharing services
Research Triangle
Cloud computing providers
Data synchronization
Companies based in Raleigh, North Carolina
Internet properties established in 2005
2011 mergers and acquisitions
2005 establishments in North Carolina